Savinjek (also spelled Savinek or Savinjk, and in older sources Zavinek) is a former settlement in the Municipality of Krško in northeastern Slovenia. It is now part of the village of Žabjek v Podbočju. The area is part of the traditional region of Lower Carniola. The municipality is now included in the Lower Sava Statistical Region.

Geography
Savinjek stands southeast of the village center of Žabjek v Podbočju.

History
Savinjek  was annexed by Žabjek v Podbočju in 1953, ending its existence as an independent settlement.

References

External links
Savinjek (unmarked) with Žabjek at Geopedia

Populated places in the Municipality of Krško
Former settlements in Slovenia